John Bowes MacDougall  (1890–1967) was a 20th-century physician and phthisiologist who also was a Scottish international rugby union player who won five caps between 1913 and 1921. He was a world expert in the field of tuberculosis. As an unusual pastime he was interested in rabbit breeding.

Life

He was born in Greenock on 5 December 1890 the son of Allan McDougall. He was educated at Greenock Academy.

He studied medicine at Glasgow University graduating MB ChB in 1914. He received a commission in the First World War and served as a major in the Royal Army Medical Corps at the No 30 General Hospital in Calais, France. He received his doctorate (MD) in 1916, while on active service.

In 1924 he became medical director of the Preston Hall Sanatorium near Maidstone, Kent. In 1931 he was elected a fellow of the Royal Society of Edinburgh. His proposers were Sir George Newman, Noel Dean Bardswell, Sir Frederick Menzies and Donald McIntyre. In the 1943 New Year's Honours List he was created a Commander of the Order of the British Empire (CBE).

In 1945 he left Preston Hall to become Chief Tuberculosis Officer for the World Health Organization, the highest position in his field of expertise.

He died in Athens in Greece on 30 September 1967 aged 76.

Rugby career

He played club rugby for Greenock Wanderers and Wakefield RFC.

He originally joined Wakefield RFC on being posted to the West Riding County Council as Chief Tuberculosis Officer. In 1947 he became Chief of the Tuberculosis section of the World Health Organization.

He organised Wakefield RFC's 'Coming of age' fete and Bazaar in 1922.

Publications

How to Become an Efficient Athlete (1922)
The Rabbit in Health and Disease (1929)
Angoras in the Colonies (1932)
Rehabilitating the Tuberculous (1945)
Rabbit Keeping (1946)
Tuberculosis: A Global Study of Social Pathology (1949)

Family

He married twice. In 1920 he married Sarah Purdy Shepherd. In 1954 he married Marietta Tsitsecles from Greece.

References

1890 births
1967 deaths
Scottish rugby union players
Scotland international rugby union players
Wakefield RFC players
Rugby union players from Greenock
British Army personnel of World War I
Royal Army Medical Corps officers
Rugby union locks